Trinity Spooner-Neera is a current player for the New Zealand-based Hawkes Bay Magpies rugby union team. He plays fullback and second five eight. He has played for the Magpies in 11 games, and is currently part of the Hurricanes Development Squad. He has 2 caps for the Hurricanes, both off the bench.

References

External links
All Blacks Profile

1994 births
Living people
New Zealand international rugby sevens players
Hurricanes (rugby union) players
Hawke's Bay rugby union players
Wanganui rugby union players
Taranaki rugby union players
Rugby union fly-halves
Rugby union fullbacks